USS MacKenzie may refer to the following ships of the United States Navy:

, was the lead ship of MacKenzie-class torpedo boats, commissioned in 1899 and struck in 1916
, was a Wickes-class destroyer commissioned in 1919, decommissioned and turned over to the Royal Canadian Navy in 1940 and recommissioned HMCS Annapolis. The ex-MacKenzie was struck from the US Naval list in 1941
, was a Benson-class destroyer, commissioned in 1942 and struck in 1971
, was a Gearing-class destroyer commissioned in 1945 and struck in 1976

United States Navy ship names